Miss International 1968, the 8th Miss International pageant, was held on October 9, 1968, at the Nippon Budokan Hall in Tokyo, Japan, marking the first overseas hosting of the Miss International pageant after staging in Long Beach, California since its inception in 1960. Maria Carvalho from Brazil was crowned the winner by outgoing titleholder, Mirta Massa from Argentina.

Results

Placements

Contestants

  - Ana Inés Puiggros
  - Monique Denise Hughes
  - Huberta Kessler
  - Janine Patteeuw
  - Ana Maria Urenda Amelunga
  - Maria Carvalho
  - Patricia Lane
  - Manel Eriyagama
  - Christina Hui Ling-Ling
  - Rosario Barraza Villa
  - Marie-Josée Basoko
  - Ana Maria Rivera
  - Dorrit Frantzen
  - Enriqueta Valdez Fuentes
  - Gloria Best
  - Satu Sinikka Kostiainen
  - Nelly Gallerne
  - Margot Schmalzriedt
  - Fani Sakantani
  - Cecille van der Lelie
  - Christina Hui Ling-Ling 
  - Sumita Sen
  - Sylvia Taliwongso
  - Frances Clarke
  - Daniela Hod
  - Vanna Torri
  - Yoko Sunami
  - Kim Hee-ja
  - Mady Reiter
  - Maznah Binte Mohammed Ali
  - Aroha T. H. Manawatu
  - Nadia Leets Lacayo
  - Hedda Lie
  - Nenita Tuazon Ramos
  - Elsa Maria Schroeder Méndez
  - Marie Smith
  - Madeleine Teo Kim Neo
  - Mary Winifred McDonald
  - Yolanda Legarreta Urquijo
  - Annika Hemminge
  - Irene Stierli
  - Haniarii Viola Teriitahi
  - Rungtip Pinyo
  - Gul Ustun
  - Soledad Gandos
  - Karen Ann MacQuarrie
  - Yovann Josefina Navas Ravelo
  - Kay House
  - Tatjana Albahari

External links
Pageantopolis - Miss International 1968

1968
1968 in Tokyo
1968 beauty pageants
October 1968 events in Asia
Beauty pageants in Japan